John Spencer may refer to:

Earls
John Spencer, 1st Earl Spencer (1734–1783), MP for Warwick 1756–1761
John Spencer, 3rd Earl Spencer (1782–1845), British politician
John Spencer, 5th Earl Spencer (1835–1910), British politician
John Spencer, 8th Earl Spencer (1924–1992), father of Diana, Princess of Wales

Politicians
John Spencer (courtier) (died 1417), a servant of Henry V, MP for Suffolk, and High Sheriff of Norfolk and Suffolk in 1416
Sir John Spencer (died 1522) (1455–1522), English landowner in Northamptonshire
Sir John Spencer (sheriff) (1524–1586), MP for Northamptonshire and High Sheriff of Northamptonshire
Sir John Spencer (died 1600) (1549–1600), MP for Northampton, 1572 and High Sheriff of Northamptonshire 1578,1590
John Spencer (Lord Mayor of London) (died 1610), merchant and Lord Mayor of London
John Spencer (British politician) (1708–1746), father of the 1st Earl Spencer
John Canfield Spencer (1788–1855), American politician 
John Spencer (mayor) (born 1946), former mayor of Yonkers, New York and an unsuccessful candidate for the United States Senate
John W. Spencer (1864–1939), Justice of the Supreme Court of Indiana

Sportsmen
John Spencer (snooker player) (1935–2006), English snooker player
John Spencer (Scottish footballer) (born 1970), Scottish international football player and manager
John Spencer (footballer, born 1934) (1934–2007), English football player for Sheffield United
John Spencer (footballer, born 1898) (1898–?), English football player for Stoke
John Spencer (rugby union, born 1947), former English national rugby union team captain
John Spencer (cricketer, born 1949), former Sussex cricketer
John Spencer (cricketer, born 1954), former Wiltshire cricketer
John Spencer (rugby, born 1880) (1880–1936), New Zealand rugby player
John Spencer (Australian footballer) (1927–1998), Australian rules footballer
John Spencer (rugby league, born 1946) (1946–2021), Australian rugby league player
Johnny Spencer (1897–1984), American Negro leagues baseball player

Others
John Spenser or Spencer (1559–1614), one of the translators of the authorized version (1611) of the Bible and president of Corpus Christi College, Oxford
John Spencer (priest) (1630–1693), English clergyman and scholar, Master of Corpus Christi College, Cambridge
Pseudonym of William Edward Vickers (1889–1965), English mystery writer
John Spencer (actor) (1946–2005), American actor in television series' including L.A. Law and The West Wing
John Spencer (boat designer) (1931–1996), New Zealand architect and boat designer
John H. Spencer (1907–2005), historian and advisor to Ethiopia
John O. Spencer (1857–1947), fifth president of Morgan College
Henk van Broekhoven, later known as John Spencer, Dutch singer, see The Dynamic Rockers
John Spencer (businessman) (1934 or 1935–2016), New Zealand business magnate
John Spencer, American military officer, researcher and author

See also
Jon Spencer (born 1965), American rock musician
John Spencer-Churchill (disambiguation)
John Spenser (disambiguation)
John Spencer & Co, British paperback publisher
Jack Spencer (disambiguation)